Mosaic is the fourth studio album by English new wave band Wang Chung, released on 14 October 1986 by Geffen Records. The album was commercially successful, producing three US Top 40 songs: "Everybody Have Fun Tonight" (peaked at No. 2 on the Billboard Hot 100), "Let's Go!" (No. 9 on the Hot 100), and "Hypnotize Me" (No. 36 on the Hot 100). Mosaic earned a Gold certification by the RIAA and hit No. 41 on the Billboard 200 album charts.

Cover art
The album cover features photographs of lead vocalist and guitarist Jack Hues and bassist Nick Feldman, with a mosaic effect applied to the pictures. The resulting graphic is a literal representation of the album's title. The sleeve features Hues on the front cover with the track listing of side one, while the reverse is upside down and shows Feldman with the track listing of side two. On some CD editions, both photographs have been laid horizontally on the front cover, and the full track listing appears on the back cover.

Track listing
All songs produced and arranged by Wang Chung and Peter Wolf; all songs written by Wang Chung, unless noted otherwise.

CD

Cassette/LP

Chart performance

Weekly charts

Year-end charts

Certifications

Personnel
Wang Chung
 Jack Hues – lead vocals, guitars, keyboards
 Nick Feldman – lead vocals (on "Let's Go!"), additional vocals, bass, guitars, keyboards

Other guest musicians
 Peter Wolf – drums, keyboards, Synclavier, choral voices
 Dann Huff – guitars on "Hypnotize Me"
 Herbert Graf, Otmar Klein, Hannes Kottek and Harry Sokal – horns
 Kevin Dorsey, Siedah Garrett, Phil Perry, Joe Pizzulo, Michael McDonald, Julia Waters, Oren Waters and Ina Wolf – backing vocals

Production
 Engineered by Brian Malouf and Peter Muller
 Assisted by Tim Alban, Jim Dineen, Steve Ford and Marvin Wolf
 Recorded at Videosonics, London; Sound Mill Studios, Vienna
 Mixed at CAN-AM Recorders, Tarzana, California; Mama Jo's, North Hollywood, California ("Hypnotize Me" only)
 Mixed by Paul Gomersall, Martyn "Max" Heyes and Tim Weidener
 Mastered by Bernie Grundman at Bernie Grundman Mastering, Hollywood
 CDD pre-mastering by WCI Record Group
 Photography by Simon Fowler
 Art direction and design by Norman Moore
 John Kalodner : John Kalodner
 Management: David Massey for Domino Directions, Ltd.

References

External links
 

1986 albums
Geffen Records albums
Wang Chung (band) albums
Albums produced by Peter Wolf